The Emerald Futsal League was a futsal league featuring  teams based in the Republic of Ireland. It was initially planned that the league would develop into a full national league. However the vast majority of its member clubs are based in the Greater Dublin Area. It is effectively a provincial league and, as a result, is also referred to as the Emerald Futsal League (Leinster). The league was introduced in 2008 and the inaugural winners were Brasilforall. Teams from the league cannot automatically qualify for the UEFA Futsal Cup but can qualify by winning the FAI Futsal Cup.

Since the league disbanded, the AUL Futsal Premier League became the top tier of Irish futsal.

History
The Emerald Futsal League was founded in 2008 as a joint partnership project involving four organisations – the Futsal Association of Ireland, Futsal Ireland, Sport Against Racism Ireland and Dublin City Council. The league kicked off on 2 November 2008 with three games played at the Ballyfermot Leisure Centre. The participants included Brasilforall, Polish Eagles, Futsamba, Perestroika, English in Dublin and Dublin Futsal. The inaugural champions were Brasilforall who were subsequently taken over by St Patrick's Athletic. The 2009 Emerald Futsal League kicked off on 25 June 2009 with four games played at the BRL Umbro Arena, Ballymun. Dublin Santos played Shamrock Rovers in the first game. Other members this season included Sporting Fingal, St Patrick's Athletic, Bray/St Joseph's, Alpha United, ISL Futsal and North County Dublin. In October 2009 Shamrock Rovers won the second Emerald Futsal League title after a 7–4 win in the final against Bray/St Joseph's. Since 2010 Emerald Futsal League teams have competed in the FAI Futsal Cup.
Emerald Futsal League teams can also qualify to compete in the UEFA Futsal Cup after winning the FAI Futsal Cup. Shamrock Rovers and St Patrick's Athletic qualified for the 2007–08 and 2008–09 tournaments before the Emerald Futsal League started. Playing under various names including, Sporting Fingal EID, EID Futsal and Eden College, Eden Futsal Club qualified for the UEFA Futsal Cup on five consecutive occasions between 2010–11 and 2014–15. Blue Magic Futsal qualified for the 2015–16 and 2016–17 tournaments.

Format
The league consists of a regular league season plus a series of play-off matches to decide the eventual champions.

Teams

2014–15 season

Previous seasons

Winners

References

External links
  Leinster Emerald Futsal League
  Emerald Futsal League on Facebook
  Emerald Futsal League on Twitter

 
Ireland
Futsal competitions in the Republic of Ireland
Association football leagues in the Republic of Ireland
Sports leagues established in 2008
2008 establishments in Ireland